Jaider, der einsame Jäger ("Jaider, the lonely hunter") is a 1971 Bavarian Western film directed by Volker Vogeler. It was entered into the 21st Berlin International Film Festival. It was the film debut of Gottfried John, in which his screen presence was compared to Clint Eastwood.

Cast

See also
 Yankee Dudler (1973)

References

Bibliography

External links

1971 films
1971 drama films
1970s adventure drama films
1970s German-language films
1971 Western (genre) films
German adventure films
West German films
Films directed by Volker Vogeler
Films set in the 1870s
Films set in Bavaria
Films set in the Alps
1970s German films